The 2022 NAB AFL Women's Rising Star award was presented to the player adjudged the best young player during the 2022 AFL Women's season. Mimi Hill of the Carlton Football Club won the award with 43 votes.

Eligibility
Every round, two nominations will be given to standout young players who performed well during that particular round. To be eligible for nomination, players must have been under 21 years of age on 1 January 2022 and not suspended during the season.

Nominations

Final voting

References

2022 AFL Women's season